McCurtain is a town in Haskell County, Oklahoma, United States. The population was 357 at the 2020 census, a 30.8% decrease over the figure of 516 recorded in 2010. A coal mine disaster in 1912 killed 73 miners and ended McCurtain's prosperity. The mine explosion remains one of the worst disasters in Oklahoma history.

History
In 1889, coal deposits discovered in the area that would become southern Haskell County attracted some European miners and American entrepreneurs. They established a community called Panther, which was renamed in 1902 to honor Choctaw Principal Chief Green McCurtain. Another mining town, Chant, was established nearby, and the two began to grow together. McCurtain and Chant prospered after the Fort Smith and Western Railroad connected McCurtain with Fort Smith, Arkansas in 1901. The railroad was built westward until it reached the Canadian River in 1902. The San Bois Coal Company built four hundred company houses for miners  living in McCurtain and Chant. By 1907 statehood the combined population of the two communities was 1,760.

A post office was established at Panther, Indian Territory on June 11, 1890.  Its name was changed to McCurtain, Indian Territory on April 5, 1902.  The site was located one half-mile west of its present site.  At the time of its founding, the community was located in the Moshulatubbee District of the Choctaw Nation.

In 1901 the two towns thrived as the Fort Smith and Western Railroad built to McCurtain, connecting it with Fort Smith, Arkansas. In 1902 the railroad continued building westward, reaching the South (main) Canadian River. The San Bois Coal Company built four hundred company houses, and McCurtain, as well as Chant, saw the addition of banks, stores, schools, newspapers, and even a bottling company. By 1907 statehood the combined population of the communities stood at 1,760, although in 1908 business directories suggested a combined population of 3,800, which would have been the largest to be seen in Haskell County. Newspapers that have served the two communities included the Haskell County Chant News, the Hustler, McCurtain American, McCurtain Leader, and Sans Bois News.

The towns and all of their successes, however, could not withstand the events of March 20, 1912, when a terrific underground explosion in Mine Number Two took the lives of seventy-three miners and sent the San Bois Coal Company into bankruptcy. With mining all but played out, the town's combined population dropped to 1,341 in 1920. The communities officially consolidated in 1922, but the Chant post office had closed in 1910. In 1940 the population rested at 870, declining to 528 by 1960. By 2000 the last of the mines had all closed. The town's population had dwindled to 466, a downward trend that reversed; in 2010 the number stood at 516. The only reminder of McCurtain's once-prosperous past was a memorial standing silently at the site of old Mine Number Two and seventy-three graves in the nearby Miners Cemetery.According to the Encyclopedia of Oklahoma History and Culture, "The only reminder McCurtain had to show of its once prosperous past was a memorial standing silently at the site of old Mine Number Two and seventy-three graves in the nearby Miners Cemetery."

Geography
McCurtain is located at  (35.150189, -94.971457).

Demographics
As of the census of 2000, there were 466 people, 178 households, and 122 families residing in the town. There were 213 housing units at an average density of 192.2 per square mile (74.1/km2). The racial makeup of the town was 75.54% White, 16.74% Native American, 1.29% Asian, and 6.44% from two or more races. Hispanic or Latino of any race were 1.29% of the population.

There were 178 households, out of which 36.0% had children under the age of 18 living with them, 54.5% were married couples living together, 11.8% had a female householder with no husband present, and 30.9% were non-families. 29.8% of all households were made up of individuals, and 17.4% had someone living alone who was 65 years of age or older. The average household size was 2.62 and the average family size was 3.28.

In the town, the population was spread out, with 30.5% under the age of 18, 9.2% from 18 to 24, 24.2% from 25 to 44, 21.7% from 45 to 64, and 14.4% who were 65 years of age or older. The median age was 34 years. For every 100 females, there were 95.8 males. For every 100 females age 18 and over, there were 97.6 males.

The median income for a household in the town was $22,188, and the median income for a family was $29,167. Males had a median income of $29,167 versus $15,833 for females. The per capita income for the town was $11,410. About 16.2% of families and 22.5% of the population were below the poverty line, including 28.2% of those under age 18 and 25.0% of those age 65 or over.

References

Towns in Haskell County, Oklahoma
Towns in Oklahoma